Hunter Mense (born August 30, 1984) is an American professional baseball coach with for the Toronto Blue Jays of Major League Baseball (MLB). He was promoted to the Blue Jays major league coaching staff ahead of the 2022 season, in the role of assistant hitting coach.

Playing career 
Mense attended the University of Missouri and played baseball for the Tigers, eventually being drafted in the 17th round of the 2006 MLB Draft by the Florida Marlins. He spent parts of five seasons in the Marlins minor league system, briefly reaching Triple-A in 2010. Mense produced a .254 average and 19 home runs over 349 career MiLB games.

Coaching career 
Mense served as the hitting coach for the Double-A New Hampshire Fisher Cats in 2018, who subsequently won the league championship. Mense then spent three seasons as the Minor League hitting coordinator for the Blue Jays. Ahead of the 2022 season, the Blue Jays promoted Mense to the major league staff as an assistant hitting coach, while still retaining his minor league coordinating title.

References

External links 
 Career statistics and player information from MLB and Baseball Reference (Minors)

1984 births
Living people
Baseball coaches from Missouri
Toronto Blue Jays coaches
New Orleans Zephyrs players
Missouri Tigers baseball players
Greensboro Grasshoppers players
Jacksonville Suns players
Jamestown Jammers players
Jupiter Hammerheads players
Kansas City T-Bones players
American expatriate baseball people in Canada